Pape Meïssa Ba (born 4 July 1997) is a Senegalese professional footballer who plays as a forward for  club Grenoble.

Career
Ba is a youth product of Dakar Sacré-Coeur. On 23 February 2019, he signed a professional contract with Troyes. He made his professional debut in a 0–0 Ligue 2 tie with Nancy on 8 November 2019. On 3 December 2019, he scored his first senior goal for the club in a Ligue 2 match against Rodez.

On 31 January 2021, Ba joined Championnat National club Red Star, where he became a regular starter. In the 2021–22 Championnat National, he finished as top scorer with 21 goals. In June 2022, Ba signed for Ligue 2 side Grenoble on a three-year contract.

References

External links
 
 
 

1997 births
Living people
Footballers from Dakar
Senegalese footballers
Association football forwards
ES Troyes AC players
Red Star F.C. players
Grenoble Foot 38 players
Ligue 2 players
Championnat National players
Championnat National 3 players
Senegalese expatriate footballers
Senegalese expatriate sportspeople in France
Expatriate footballers in France